The International Campaign for Justice in Bhopal (ICJB) is a coalition of disaster survivors and environmental, social justice, progressive Indian, and human rights groups that have joined forces to hold the Indian Government and Dow Chemical Corporation accountable for the ongoing chemical disaster in Bhopal.

Stated mission

 To ensure adequate health care and rehabilitation for the survivors (and their children) of the Bhopal Disaster.
 To achieve a safe environment in Bhopal by proper remediation.
 To bring to trial those charged with crimes, and secure heavy punishment of the guilty.
 To pressure the United States, India, Union Carbide's current owner the Dow Chemical Company to realize these aims.

Beliefs

 The Precautionary Principle
 The Polluter Pays Principle
 The Right to Know
 International Liability
 Environmental Justice

Aims

 To bring Warren Anderson to criminal court in India.
 To bring Union Carbide Corporation to criminal court in India in the corporate person of Dow Chemical which acquired Union Carbide in 2001.
 To get Dow Chemical to
 pay further compensation to the Bhopal Disaster victims;
 pay for the long term health care of the Bhopal Disaster survivors;
 release any medical information about the released gases that they hold as trade secrets;
 pay for the environmental clean-up of the
 abandoned plant;
 surrounding land;
 ground water; and
 local drinking water supplies;
 provide clean & safe drinking water to communities with polluted water.

Bibliography

Further reading

External links 
ICJB Archive
Beyond Bhopal - The Inquiry
Students for Bhopal
ICJB U.S.

Bhopal disaster